The Eparchy of Passaic is a Ruthenian Greek Catholic Church ecclesiastical territory or eparchy of the Catholic Church in the eastern United States. Its headquarters are at 445 Lackawanna Avenue, Woodland Park, New Jersey (formerly West Patterson). The Eparchy of Passaic is a suffragan eparchy in the ecclesiastical province of the metropolitan Archeparchy of Pittsburgh.

On October 29, 2013, Pope Francis appointed Father Kurt Burnette, until then the Rector of Saints Cyril and Methodius Seminary, in Pittsburgh, Pennsylvania (since October 2012), as Eparch-elect of the Eparchy, succeeding William Skurla, who had become the leader of the Byzantine Catholic Archeparchy of Pittsburgh. The Eparchy was erected July 6, 1963 and its seat is the Cathedral of St. Michael the Archangel, in the episcopal see of Passaic, New Jersey. Its first bishop was Stephen Kocisko. Currently, the Eparchy has 89 parishes under its canonical jurisdiction.

Eparchs
Stephen John Kocisko † (July 6, 1963 - December 22, 1967) Appointed, Eparch of Pittsburgh (Ruthenian)
Michael Joseph Dudick † (July 29, 1968 - November 6, 1995) Retired
Andrew Pataki † (November 6, 1995 - December 6, 2007) Retired
William C. Skurla (December 6, 2007 - January 19, 2012) Appointed, Archeparch of Pittsburgh (Ruthenian)
Kurt Burnette (December 4, 2013 – Present)

Parishes
The eparchy encompasses parishes located in the following states:
Connecticut
Florida
Georgia
Maryland
New Jersey
New York
North Carolina
Pennsylvania (eastern counties)
South Carolina
Virginia

Bishops

Ordinaries
 Stephen John Kocisko (1963-1967), appointed Bishop of Pittsburgh (Ruthenian)
 Michael Joseph Dudick (1968-1995)
 Andrew Pataki (1995-2007)
 William Charles Skurla(2007-2013), appointed Archbishop of Pittsburgh (Ruthenian)
 Kurt Richard Burnette (2013-

Other priest of this eparchy who became bishop
 Gerald Nicholas Dino, appointed Bishop of Van Nuys (Ruthenian) in 2007

See also
 Byzantine Catholic Metropolitan Church of Pittsburgh
 Byzantine Catholic Archeparchy of Pittsburgh
 Byzantine Catholic Eparchy of Parma
 Byzantine Catholic Eparchy of Phoenix
 Byzantine Catholic Exarchate of Saints Cyril and Methodius of Toronto

References

External links
 American Byzantine Catholic Hierarchy and Clergy-Found at The Carpathian Connection
 Ruthenian Catholic Eparchy of Passaic Official Site
 Eparchy of Passaic (Ruthenian) at Catholic-Hierarchy.org
The Archeparchy of Pittsburgh
 Metropolia of Pittsburgh
 Byzantine Catholic Church in America

Passaic
Catholicism in New Jersey
Passaic
Passaic, New Jersey
Passaic
Passaic
Rusyn-American culture in Maryland
Rusyn-American culture in New Jersey
Rusyn-American culture in New York (state)
Rusyn-American culture in Pennsylvania
Woodland Park, New Jersey